The 1914 Major League Baseball season was contested from April 13 to October 13, 1914. The Federal League declared itself as a "third major league" for the 1914 season, with its own eight teams, in competition with the established National and American Leagues.

The Boston Braves and Philadelphia Athletics were the regular season champions of the National League and American League, respectively. The Braves then defeated the Athletics in the World Series, four games to none. Meanwhile, the Indianapolis Hoosiers won the 1914 Federal League pennant.

This was the last of four seasons that the Chalmers Award, a precursor to the Major League Baseball Most Valuable Player Award (introduced in 1931), was given to a player in each of the established National and American Leagues.

Awards and honors
Chalmers Award
 Eddie Collins, Philadelphia Athletics, 2B
 Johnny Evers, Boston Braves, 2B

Statistical leaders

Standings

American League

National League

Federal League

Postseason

Bracket

Managers

American League

National League

Federal League

Events
 September 21 – Walter Johnson of the Washington Senators has four wild pitches in an inning.

References

External links 
1914 Major League Baseball season schedule at Baseball Reference Retrieved January 14, 2018

 
Major League Baseball seasons